The Masood Jhandir Research Library is the largest private library of Pakistan. It is located in a small village Sardar Pur Jhandir in the Mailsi Tehsil, Vehari District of Punjab province, Pakistan. It was established in 1899 by a great scholar and poet, Malik Ghulam Muhammad (1865–1936).

It is considered as a world class library in a village. The new library complex was completed in 2007. It covers an area of 21000 square feet. It consists of 8 commodious halls, auditorium, committee room, multimedia workstation, reception hall and office. The library is surrounded by an attractive park of 5000 acres.

Collection

MJRL has the following collection:

Table 1 Collection of the Library

Sr. Collection Details No.

1. Total No of books: 360,000

2.  Periodicals 

Ref: Library Philosophy and Practice (LPP) available at http://unllib.unl.edu/LPP/shafique-rehman-mukhtar.htm

Services
It is a non-lending research library.  It offers many services to Research Scholars.  As this library is located at a small village, this library also provide lodging facility to its users too

References

External links
 

Libraries in Pakistan